Seri Delima is a state constituency in Penang, Malaysia, that has been represented in the Penang State Legislative Assembly since 2004. It covers parts of Gelugor, a suburb of George Town, as well as the affluent neighbourhood of Green Lane.

The state constituency was first contested in 2004 and is mandated to return a single Assemblyman to the Penang State Legislative Assembly under the first-past-the-post voting system. , the State Assemblyman for Seri Delima is Syerleena Abdul Rashid from the Democratic Action Party (DAP), which is part of the state's ruling coalition, Pakatan Harapan (PH).

Definition

Polling districts 
According to the federal gazette issued on 30 March 2018, the Seri Delima constituency is divided into 7 polling districts.

This state seat comprises the northern half of Gelugor, a suburb of George Town, and the leafy, affluent neighbourhood of Green Lane.

Seri Delima is bounded to the north by Green Lane and Jalan Tunku Kudin. The southern limits of the constituency roughly follows the course of the Gelugor River into the sea, with the portion of Gelugor south of the river coming under the neighbouring Batu Uban constituency.

Demographics

History

Election results 
The electoral results for the Seri Delima state constituency in 2008, 2013 and 2018 are as follows.

See also 
 Constituencies of Penang

References 

Penang state constituencies